Wakefulness is a 2007 novella by Norwegian writer Jon Fosse.

The story is set a few hundred years ago. The young couple, "Asle" and "Alida", has come to the city of Bjørgvin, looking for a place to stay. She is expecting a child in a couple of days. Alida is an outcast, her own mother will not recognize her, and Asle is orphaned. Now they only have each other. A parallel can be drawn to the fate of Joseph and Mary in the Gospels.

Awards
In 2015, Fosse was awarded the Nordic Council's Literature Prize for the trilogy Wakefulness, Olav's Dreams and Weariness.

References

External links
 American publicity page

2007 novels
21st-century Norwegian novels
Norwegian-language novels
Nordic Council's Literature Prize-winning works
Novels by Jon Fosse